Henry Stewart may refer to:

Henry Stewart, 1st Lord Methven (–1552), third husband of Margaret Tudor, sister of Henry VIII of England
Henry Frederick, Prince of Wales (1594–1612), eldest son of James I of England
Henry Stewart (cricketer) (1763–1837), amateur cricketer from Hampshire
Henry Stewart (politician) (1749–1840), Irish MP for Longford Borough 1783–90, 1791–99
Henry Stewart (footballer, born 1847) (1847–1937), Scottish football player and later an Anglican priest, FA Cup winner in 1873
Henry Stewart (footballer, born 1925) (1925–1996), English football player for Huddersfield
Henry Stewart (priest) (1836–1886), Anglican priest in Ireland
Henry Stewart (archdeacon of Brecon) (1873–1960), Welsh Anglican priest

See also
Henry Stuart (disambiguation)
Harry Stewart (1908–1956), American comedian